Prokhor (Прохор) is a Russian name from the Latinised form Prochorus that originated from the Greek name Prochoros (Προχορος). Its diminutive form is Proshka.

References
 
Russian masculine given names